Torrente, the Dumb Arm of the Law is a 1998 Spanish dark comedy film written and directed by Santiago Segura, who stars as José Luis Torrente, a racist, sexist, homophobic, xenophobic, and fascist former police agent. Characterized by its deliberately thick, cartoonish humor, it proved to be a massive box office hit, and Torrente became part of Spanish contemporary popular culture.

This film won two Goya awards and it became the highest-grossing film in the history of Spanish cinema, later surpassed by its sequel, (Torrente 2: Misión en Marbella). It also laid the foundations of the Torrente film series by Santiago Segura, who also directed the sequel, the third (Torrente 3: El protector), the fourth (Torrente 4: Lethal Crisis) and fifth (Torrente 5: Operación Eurovegas) films. The last two were shot in stereoscopic 3D.

Plot
José Luis Torrente is a lazy, rude, drunkard, sexist, racist, right-wing ex-policeman turned fake cop who lives in a decrepit apartment in a slum neighbourhood of Madrid with his father, whose disability checks are Torrente's only real income.

One day, a new family of neighbours who owns and operates a fish store moves into the apartment below Torrente's and he becomes attracted to the young, nymphomaniac niece of the family, Amparo. In order to get close to her, he befriends her nerdy weapon enthusiast cousin, Rafi, by taking him to target practice and on his nightly patrol rounds through the neighbourhood. During their patrols, Torrente begins to suspect that criminal activity is occurring in the new local Chinese restaurant. His suspicions are confirmed when his father accidentally overdoses after eating a stolen food roll which was filled with packets of heroin. Torrente decides to crack the drug ring in order to regain his former status within the Police Force.

Simultaneously, Torrente successfully attempts to seduce Amparo, who has sex with him after his father's overdose. Amparo's aunt, Reme, misreads her relationship with Torrente and believes that they are engaged.

Torrente and Rafi sneak into the restaurant at night and witness El Francés, the underboss of the drug trafficking outfit run by a mobster named Mendoza, torturing and executing a delivery boy named Wang, who had lost a shipment of the heroin (which in reality was unwittingly taken by Torrente's father) and they overhear that the outfit will soon be receiving a major drug shipment from a mobster known as Farelli. The pair accidentally make their presence known and flee the restaurant on Rafi's fish delivery van while being chased by armed delivery boys.

Torrente enlists the help of Rafi's equally nerdy friends: Malaguita, a martial artist, Bombilla, an electronics expert, and Toneti, a James Bond aficionado. The crew picks up Torrente's father from the hospital (while drunk) and then prepare a reconnaissance mission to discover the location of the drug deal. Toneti goes to the Chinese restaurant while wearing a wire but quickly blows his cover and winds up revealing Torrente's name to El Francés before trying to escape through a window and falling to his death.

El Francés and some of his goons raid Torrente's apartment but are attacked by Torrente's father, who wields a taser and some pliers, before the father suffers a heart attack and plummets down a flight of stairs. Nonetheless, they kidnap Amparo when she arrived to the apartment looking for Torrente.

After discovering his father's death and Amparo's kidnapping, Torrente becomes despondent but soon after Lio-Chii, Wang's girlfriend and a waitress at the Chinese restaurant who had once waited on a drunken Torrente, arrives and reveals the location of the drug deal, claiming she wants revenge for her boyfriend's death.

Torrente, Rafi, Malaguita, Bombilla, Lio-Chii and Torrente's friend and informant Carlitos head over to the drug deal on an old warehouse outside town. The crew plan a very complex plot to bring down the deal and take the 50 million pesetas that Mendoza brought but the plan goes raw from the start when Bombita accidentally blows himself and Farelli up with a bomb he'd set up as a distraction. Farelli's men and Mendoza's men begin shooting at each other and in the aftermath, most of the mobsters and Carlitos end up dead. Torrente guns down El Francés and ends up getting shot in the stomach himself, while Rafi goes to rescue Amparo (who had been providing oral service to Mendoza's men in a back room). Rafi gets cornered by Mendoza but he's rescued when Lio-Chii shoots him in the back.

In the aftermath of the shootout, Rafi and Malaguita get congratulated by police commissioner Cayetano for helping in bringing down one of the most vicious local drug rings and Rafi begins a relationship with Lio-Chii. Torrente gets taken away on an ambulance for his wounds. Cayetano sweeps the scene and discovers that the money is gone. In the ambulance speeding away, Torrente bribes the ambulance drivers and flees to Torremolinos with the 50 million pesetas that he swiped while no one was watching.

Cast

Production

Project and influences 
Segura decided to direct his first film while preparing the final scene of The Day of the Beast, where he played one of the leading characters. As an actor, he believed there was enough drama to provoke pity when his character died, but director Alex de la Iglesia ignored him and made him realize that in order to do what you want with the characters you have to direct. Segura's debut film shows many influences of Spanish comedy, and a risky handling of humor. The most recognizable influence is perhaps that of Luis García Berlanga, but one can also venture some references to Luis Buñuel, and his partner, the Mexican Luis Alcoriza. Santiago Segura resurrected the Spanish popular comedy, paying a tribute to the films of Alfredo Landa, Mariano Ozores and others.

According to Segura, he conceived the main character, José Luis Torrente during a lunch in a Chinese restaurant, when he saw a customer who was so rude to the waitress that relatives who had lunch with him felt ashamed. He then added gave the character traces of beings as despicable and egotistical as the Nero from Quo vadis?, Chief Wiggum from The Simpsons or Orson Welles's character in The Third Man. Torrente's father Felipe was inspired on Tony Leblanc, the actor who plays him, and who had suffered a car accident that left him disabled.

Vis-à-vis its gross-out vein, the film has also been found reminiscent of John Landis' Animal House (Landis himself later made a cameo appearance in the Torrente sequels).

The film had a budget of 280 million peseta (€1.7 million).

Casting 
Santiago Segura reserved the title role for himself. He put on between 20 and 30 kg to play the character. He had great successes in casting Neus Asensi, Jimmy Barnatán and, above all, Javier Cámara, in addition to the idea of "reviving"  Tony Leblanc, who had been retired for 23 years. The film also has numerous cameos by leading Spanish actors such as Jorge Sanz, Gabino Diego, and Javier Bardem), and many other faces familiar to the general public such as Poli Díaz, Pepe Navarro, Cañita Brava, Andreu Buenafuente, El Gran Wyoming, the comedy duo "Faemino y Cansado". Shooting of the film took place 28 July – 23 September 1997 in several places in the Community of Madrid, among which are Leganés, Móstoles, Navacerrada, San Sebastián de los Reyes and Madrid city.

Music 
The main song from the movie, "Apatrullando la ciudad", was a success through the combination of several factors: the surprise effect that the song had after the imposing symphonic start with music by two-time Goya Award winner Roque Baños; the lyrics, which contrasts with the action; and the self-parody by singer El Fary. Another song, "Torito Bravo", from the same singer appears in the film.

Release

Theatrical release 
Distributed by Columbia TriStar Films de España, the film was theatrically released in Spain on 13 March 1998.

Home media 
The DVD of the film was put on sale on 21 January 2000 and was distributed by Manga Films. It is full of faults, one of the greatest lying in the color reproduction, presented completely off. On 25 November 2008 to mark the tenth anniversary of the theatrical release, a remastered version was released by Warner Home Video providing a great improvement in the color reproduction and a better definition in the forms of objects and characters. Tt contains two posters and three pictures, in small format, chosen by the film director. This remastering was integrated into the special tenth anniversary pack in which three of the Torrente films appear.

Television 
The film's success continued on television. Its premiere earned a 31.1% share, making it the third most watched Spanish film of the decade, second only to Abuelo Made in Spain and the film's sequel Torrente 2: Misión en Marbella.

Reception

Critical reception 
Critics welcomed this first instalment of the series, some more enthusiastically than others. Most saw it as a parody of 1970s films starring Andrés Pajares and Fernando Esteso, among others. The abundant cinéphile quotations in the film and the exaggerated ridicule of the character were also appreciated. Filmmaker Luis García Berlanga said, "The film has a funny gag that defines the Spanish character to perfection: leaning at a bar, Torrente picks his teeth with a toothpick... then puts it back in the toothpick holder".

This romance with the critics ended with the sequels, which were considered of lower quality.

Juan F. Egea assessed that it seems that the whole film must be read either "as a) an explicit avowal of sexism, racism, homophobia, and xenophobia in late twentieth-century Spain, or b) a satirical denunciation of its existence".

Box office 
Its premiere took place on 13 March 1998 on 130 screens. In July, it was still showing on 76 screens, due to the good acceptance by the public. The film became a social phenomenon and was the most successful Spanish film of the year with three million viewers and a record gross for a Spanish film of $13.7 million. Santiago Segura became one of the most popular characters in Spain. Segura himself undertook an ingenious and intensive promotion program for the film, ensuring a permanent presence in specialized media. The film managed to compete with big budget films such as Titanic.

The reason for this success is the creation of a patriotic film icon, which many do not like, but which easily connected with young viewers in large urban middle layers, which make up the core of film audiences in Spain. A major success which, however, also convinced a handful of critics by his humor, sometimes vulgar and excessive.

Accolades 
The film won two of the three Goya awards for which it was nominated. When Tony Leblanc went to collect his, as best supporting actor, the audience greeted him with a standing ovation, also dedicated to Segura as the person responsible for his comeback. The director, upon being granted the award for best new director, paid to Javier Fesser 100,000 pesetas he had bet, convinced that the winner was to be Fesser for The Miracle of P. Tinto.

Adaptations 
In 1998, with Segura himself as a writer and  Jose Antonio Calvo as  artist a comic adaptation of the film was as published in the magazine El Vibora. In 2001 Virtual Toys launched Torrente: The game for PC, PlayStation 2 and Xbox, based on the first two installments of the saga and, in 2005, along with Virgin Play, Torrente 3: El protector, based on the third part. Segura lent his image and voice for the videogame. In late 2009 Santiago Segura and gaming company Ludicus, create a slot machine based in the Torrente movies.

Several films have subsequently been inspired in Torrente, such as R2 and the case of the headless corpse or Vivancos 3, if you like it we will make the first two, but achieved less success from audiences and critics. Conversations for an American remake that would be produced by Chris Bender and could be directed by Oliver Stone, who made a cameo in the third installment of the saga, took place in 2010. It was announced that the film would be produced by New Line Cinema, to be written by Alec Berg, Jeff Schaffer and David Mandel, known for the TV series Seinfeld, and that the main character would be played by Sacha Baron Cohen.  Thomas Langman, the son of Claude Berri, was also interested through his company La Petite Reine in  a remake in France.

See also 
 List of Spanish films of 1998

Notes

References

Bibliography

External links 

Torrente, el brazo tonto de la ley in Encyclopedia of Contemporary Spanish Film

1998 films
Films shot in Madrid
1990s Spanish-language films
Films set in Madrid
Films scored by Roque Baños
Films directed by Santiago Segura
Spanish action comedy films
1990s Spanish films
1998 action comedy films
1990s black comedy films